Nemanja Stojšić (born 1 February 1997) is a Serbian footballer, who plays for FK Sloga Erdevik.

Club career
Born in Sremska Mitrovica, Stojšić was with RFK Novi Sad football academy in his early years. Later he moved to OFK Hajduk, where he completed his youth career. After the club residence moved to Novi Sad, Stojšić was loaned to the local club Borac, where he appeared in Novi Sad-Syrmia Zone league during the 2015–16 season. In summer 2016 he moved to Serbian First League side Proleter Novi Sad and after passed a trial period, he signed with club for the 2016–17 season. Stojšić collected 28 matches with 1 goal in both domestic competitions for his first season with the club. After he started new season a reserve option with Proleter under coach Zoran Govedarica, Stojšić left the club for the six-month period and returned on loan deal to Borac Novi Sad.

Career statistics

Club

References

External links
 Nemanja Stojšić at serbiacorner.com

1997 births
Living people
Sportspeople from Sremska Mitrovica
Association football defenders
Serbian footballers
FK Proleter Novi Sad players
Serbian First League players